The Next Man (also known as The Arab Conspiracy or Double Hit) is a 1976 American political action thriller film starring Sean Connery, Adolfo Celi, Cornelia Sharpe, and Charles Cioffi. Critical reaction at its opening was not positive. Music for the film features New York City guitarist Frederic Hand, as well as the film score debut for composer Michael Kamen.

Plot
The film is set during the Arab Oil Embargo of 1973-1974. Khalil Abdul-Muhsen (Connery) is the Saudi Arabian minister of state who proposes to recognize Israel, support Israeli membership in OPEC and sell Saudi oil to needy nations. His plan is to protect Third World nations from the threat of Cold War ideology. Khalil's radical agenda and idealism finds few friends, and he is soon the target of multiple assassination attempts by Palestinian terrorist groups.

They send Nicole Scott (Sharpe) to infiltrate Abdul-Muhsen's entourage, seduce him, and await further instructions. However, she actually develops strong feelings for him, and the completion of the plan is jeopardized.

Cast
 Sean Connery as Khalil Abdul-Muhsen
 Cornelia Sharpe as Nicole Scott
 Albert Paulsen as Hamid
 Adolfo Celi as Al Sharif
 Marco St. John as Justin
 Ted Beniades as Frank DeDario
 Charles Cioffi as Fouad
 Jaime Sánchez as New York Security

Production
Connery's casting was announced in January 1976.

Reception
The film on its release was not received particularly well by critics. Roger Ebert on November 17, 1976, criticized the plot, remarking, "When good directors work with bad material." Pauline Kael commented, "[Good directors] shove art into the crevices of dreck. That would do as a description of The Next Man, a movie with an impenetrable plot."

Ebert commented that the film had some scenes that worked, particularly those between Sean Connery, as the minister of state for Saudi Arabia, and Cornelia Sharpe, who plays a professional international assassin, although the plot lacked details to understand these characters more fully.  Ebert was impressed by Sharpe's performance as Nicole Scott, describing her as a "cool beauty."

Vincent Canby of The New York Times described the film as a "suspense melodrama made by people whose talent for filmmaking and knowledge of international affairs would both fit comfortably into the left nostril of a small bee." Like Ebert, he identified flaws in the plot, remarking that "The Next Man is obsessed with political assassination but it never really identifies its villains, preferring, instead, to cop out by playing on natural paranoia that assumes that everyone everywhere is on the take from someone somewhere. This attitude is too easy to represent true cynicism." Canby also criticized locations in the film that added to the confusing nature of the plot, commenting "The Next Man moves rootlessly around the world like a fretful tourist, from New York City to the Middle East, the south of France, London, Ireland, Bavaria, and the Bahamas, though nothing much happens in any one of these places that couldn't as easily happen somewhere else."

Variety was not impressed, commenting, "The Next Man emerges more a slick travesty with political overtones than the cynical suspense meller it was designed to be."<ref></</ref>

Producer Martin Bregman received an official protest from the Saudi government after the film was released.

The film opened the same week in the United States as Two-Minute Warning and came third for the week at the U.S. box office behind it and Car Wash.

References

External links 
 
 

1976 films
1976 action films
1970s action thriller films
1970s English-language films
1970s spy films
Allied Artists films
American action thriller films
American spy films
Films about terrorism in the United States
Films directed by Richard C. Sarafian
Films produced by Martin Bregman
Films scored by Michael Kamen
Films set in New York City
Films set in Saudi Arabia
Films shot in New York City
1970s American films